Abdin Bey al-Arnaut (c. 1780–1827) was an Albanian commander and politician of Egypt during the early era of Muhammad Ali's rule. A member of the core group of Muhammad Ali's commanders, after his death the Abdeen Palace named after him was built on the site of his residence in Cairo and a district of the city was renamed to honour him.

Life 
In 1814 he led a campaign against the Wahhabi movement but was defeated. A year later he warned Muhammad Ali of an assassination plot against him, an intervention that gave Ali the opportunity to escape the attack. Until 1820, when he was appointed second-in-command in the Sudanese campaign, Abidin was the governor of al-Minya. During the campaign, he distinguished himself in the battle of al-Kurdi.

In April 1821 he became the first governor of the province of Dongola (approximately corresponding to eastern As Samaliya) and had his mansion designed by Christian Gottfried Ehrenberg. His main duties included the building of depots for the resupplying of passing troops and the region's tax assessment. Abidin Bey's taxation system was regarded as just and it contributed to the reduction of revolt risk in the province. However, his shipyard project for the building of sailing ships for the transport of Black African slaves from Sudan to Egypt was unsuccessful. Dongola's political stability during Abidin Bey's rule is considered unusual as rebellions were frequent in all the newly acquired territories of Egypt in the 1820s. After 1825 he returned to Egypt and was killed two years later during a mutiny.

See also 
 Turco-Egyptian conquest of Sudan (1820–1824)

References 

1780 births
1827 deaths
18th-century Albanian people
19th-century Albanian military personnel
Albanians from the Ottoman Empire
Albanian Muslims